Chilca may refer to:

Places in Peru
 Chilca District, Huancayo, Peru, a district in the province of Huancayo.
 Chilca District, Cañete, Peru, a district in the province of Cañete.
 Chilca, Cañete, Peru, a city in the province of Cañete.

Science and Technology
 Chilca Launch Range, a rocket launch test site in the Peruvian province of Cañete.

See also

Chica (disambiguation)